Roberto Strauss (born 24 June 1952) is a Mexican former swimmer who competed in the 1972 Summer Olympics.  At the 1969 Maccabiah Games in Israel he won a gold medal in freestyle, and at the 1973 Maccabiah Games he won three bronze medals in freestyle, at 100, 400, and 800 meters.

Strauss attended the University of Miami on a swimming scholarship, and later opened a swim gym in South Florida.

References

1952 births
Living people
Mexican male swimmers
Mexican male freestyle swimmers
Olympic swimmers of Mexico
Swimmers at the 1972 Summer Olympics
Pan American Games competitors for Mexico
Swimmers at the 1971 Pan American Games
Jewish swimmers
Mexican Jews
Central American and Caribbean Games gold medalists for Mexico
Maccabiah Games medalists in swimming
Maccabiah Games gold medalists for Mexico
Competitors at the 1969 Maccabiah Games
Competitors at the 1973 Maccabiah Games
Maccabiah Games bronze medalists
Competitors at the 1970 Central American and Caribbean Games
Central American and Caribbean Games medalists in swimming
Miami Hurricanes men's swimmers
20th-century Mexican people